Squalius lucumonis is a species of freshwater fish in the family Cyprinidae which is found only in Italy.

Its natural habitat is within rivers.

References 

Squalius
Endemic fauna of Italy
Fish described in 1983
Taxonomy articles created by Polbot